Croton aromaticus is a species of plant of the genus Croton and the family of Euphorbiaceae, native to in the Indian subcontinent. The plant is known as "Wel keppetiya - වෙල් කැප්පෙටියා" in Sri Lanka, where the roots, leaves and bark are widely used in Ayurveda for the treatments of bronchitis, diarrhoea, fever, malaria and dysentery.

References

External links
Antifungal properties of Croton aromaticus
Isolation and Insecticidal Activity of (-)-Hardwickiic Acid from Croton aromaticus

aromaticus